Felicia is a feminine given name.

Felicia may also refer to:

Arts
 Felicia (film), a 1965 documentary short film
 "Felicia", a song by The Constellations

Sciences
 Hurricane Felicia (disambiguation)
 294 Felicia, an asteroid in the main belt of the solar system
 Felicia (plant), a genus of daisy-like flowering plants

Other uses
 Škoda Felicia, an automobile
 Bye, Felicia, a dismissive send-off from the movie Friday

See also 
 FeliCa, a smart card system